Lake Jones (February 10, 1867 – June 7, 1930) was an American lawyer and a United States district judge of the United States District Court for the Southern District of Florida.

Education and career

Born in Vicksburg, Mississippi, Jones was a clerk and inspector for the United States Post Office Department from 1885 to 1909, and then graduated from Northwestern University Pritzker School of Law with a Bachelor of Laws in 1909. Jones was in private practice in Jacksonville, Florida, from 1909 to 1921, and was district counsel for the United States Shipping Board, Emergency Fleet Corporation from 1921 to 1924.

Federal judicial service

Jones was nominated by President Calvin Coolidge on February 1, 1924, to the United States District Court for the Southern District of California, to a new seat authorized by 42 Stat. 837. He was confirmed by the United States Senate on February 18, 1924, and received his commission the same day. His service terminated on June 7, 1930, due to his death in Jacksonville.

References

Sources
 

1867 births
1930 deaths
Judges of the United States District Court for the Southern District of Florida
Northwestern University Pritzker School of Law alumni
United States district court judges appointed by Calvin Coolidge
20th-century American judges